= Hireharakuni =

- Village
- Nickname: Harakuni
- Country: India
- State: Karnataka
- District: Dharwad

Government
  - Type: Panchayati raj (India)
  - Body: Gram panchayat

Population (2011)
  - Total: 4,721

Languages
  - Official: Kannada
- Time zone: UTC+5:30 (IST)
- Postal code: 581113
- ISO 3166 code: IN-KA
- Vehicle registration: Ka25 / Ka63
- Website: karnataka.gov.in

Hireharakuni is a village in Dharwad district of Karnataka, India.

== Demographics ==
As of the 2011 Census of India there were 985 households in Hireharakuni and a total population of 4,721 consisting of 2,425 males and 2,296 females. There were 452 children ages 0-6.
